West Salem High School is a high school located in West Salem, Wisconsin, part of the West Salem School District. As of 2011–2012, 550 students were enrolled at West Salem High School. The school employs a faculty of 70 individuals, 79% of whom have a master's degree or higher. Students have the opportunity to receive credits to the nearby University of Wisconsin–La Crosse through dual-credit courses offered.

Notable alumni
Tom Black, NBA player
David Garbers, scientist
Admiral Jay L. Johnson, retired United States Navy officer and 26th Chief of Naval Operations (CNO).
Damian Miller, MLB catcher
Arthur H. Parmelee, football coach and physician
Darin Wagner, creator of the superhero comic book "Hyper-Actives," published by Alias Enterprises.

See also
La Crosse Central High School
La Crosse Logan High School
Aquinas High School
Onalaska High School
Holmen High School

References

External links
West Salem School District

Public high schools in Wisconsin
Schools in La Crosse County, Wisconsin